Golgir (also Romanized as Golgīr) is a city & capital of Golgir District, Tombi Golgir Rural District, Masjed Soleyman County, Khuzestan Province, Iran. At the 2006 census, its population was 1,206, in 239 families.

References 

Populated places in Masjed Soleyman County
Cities in Khuzestan Province